Mario Masanés (18 September 1927 – 1979) was a Chilean cyclist. He competed in three events at the 1948 Summer Olympics.

References

External links
 

1927 births
1979 deaths
Chilean male cyclists
Olympic cyclists of Chile
Cyclists at the 1948 Summer Olympics
Sportspeople from Santiago